Sir Frank Milton Blackman, KA, KCVO, OBE (born 31 July 1926) is a Barbadian retired civil servant.

He was born in Bridgetown, Barbados, on 31 July 1926, and joined the Colonial Secretary's Office as a clerk in 1946. He was promoted to Assistant Secretary in 1957 and then served as Clerk of the Legislative Council between 1958 and 1964, Cabinet Secretary from 1966 to 1986 (including service as Head of the Civil Service for the last five years) and as Ombudsman for Barbados from 1987 to 1993.

Blackman has received a number of state honours. He was appointed a Member of the Order of the British Empire in 1964 and promoted to Officer four years later. In March 1975, he was also appointed a Commander of the Royal Victorian Order and then promoted to Knight Commander in October 1985 to mark Queen Elizabeth II's visit to the Caribbean. He was also made a Knight of St Andrew by the Governor-General of Barbados in 1985.

References 

1926 births
Living people
20th-century Barbadian people
Civil servants
Barbadian knights
Knights Commander of the Royal Victorian Order
Knights and Dames of St Andrew (Barbados)
Barbadian appointees to the Order of the British Empire